Ja'far ibn Mansur al-Yaman was an Isma'ili missionary and theological writer of the 10th century. Originally born and raised in Yemen, where his father Ibn Hawshab had established the Isma'ili  in the late 9th century, he fled the country to the court of the Fatimid caliphs in Ifriqiya, where he remained until his death. He composed poems in praise of the Fatimids' victory over the uprising of Abu Yazid, a biography of his father, and authored or compiled a number of important theological treatises.

Life
Ja'far was the son of the Kufan missionary Ibn Hawshab, who established the Isma'ili doctrine in the Yemen. By the time of his death in 914, along with his colleague Ali ibn al-Fadl al-Jayshani he had conquered large parts of the country, earning the honorific laqab of Manṣūr al-Yaman ("Conqueror of Yemen"). Ibn Hawshab refused to join him in his rebellion, and Ibn al-Fadl besieged his erstwhile colleague at the fortress of Jabal Maswar. After eight months of siege, in April 912, Ibn Hawshab sought terms, and handed over Ja'far as a hostage. Ja'far was returned after a year with a golden necklace as a gift.

After Ibn Hawshab, his sons quarrelled among themselves. Embroiled in a conflict with his brother Abu'l-Hasan, Ja'far eventually left Yemen and made for the Fatimid court in Ifriqiya. He entered the service of the second Fatimid caliph, al-Qa'im bi-Amr Allah, and witnessed the great uprising of Abu Yazid, which almost brought down the Fatimid state. He wrote poems in celebration of the eventual Fatimid victories and the gradual suppression of the revolt in 945–948, and received a fine residence in the new Fatimid capital, Mansuriya, built by the third caliph, al-Mansur bi-Nasr Allah. Under Caliph al-Mu'izz li-Din Allah he mortgaged his house and almost lost it due to debts, but was saved by the Caliph's intervention. He died at some unknown point in the early reign of al-Mu'izz.

Writings
A quasi-hagiographic biography of his father is attributed to him, although it may also have been an autobiography written by Ibn Hawshab himself. It is now lost, but known through extensive quotations in later authors, and is, according to the historian Heinz Halm, "one of the most important sources for the history of the ". 

His theological works have survived in fuller form, as they were frequently copied and reused in later Isma'ili compendiums. The most notable work is the Book of the Sage and Disciple, which is also sometimes attributed to his father. It consists of a series of encounters between a novice and his spiritual guide (the ), who gradually reveals the hidden, esoteric knowledge to his disciple. According to the scholar Shafique Virani, this work "is considered Arabic literature’s most accomplished example of the full-scale narrated dramatic dialogue".

The , an its expanded sequel , deal with esoteric interpretations of mythological figures and the lives of the Islamic prophets.

References

Sources

 
 
 
 
 
 

10th-century deaths
10th-century people from the Fatimid Caliphate
10th-century Yemeni people
Ismaili da'is
Ismaili theologians
Yemeni Ismailis
Yemeni scholars of Islam
10th-century Arabic writers
Poets from the Fatimid Caliphate
10th-century Ismailis